Runelvys Antonio Hernandez (born April 27, 1978) is a former right-handed Major League Baseball starting pitcher.

Career
Hernandez made his major league debut July 15, with Kansas City Royals. His encouraging rookie campaign manifested itself in a 4–4 record with a 4.36 ERA in  innings of work over 12 starts.

Initially thought of as the right-handed ace of the  Royals team that posted the franchise's first winning record in nine seasons, Hernandez became the opening-day pitcher by winning Royals' manager Tony Peña's coin toss against left-hander Jeremy Affeldt. After spending the first five weeks on the leaderboard in almost every pitching category, Hernandez faltered as he tried to pitch through pain, and his season ended after 16 starts. He finished the season with a 7–5 record, but missed the entire  season with Tommy John surgery.

On July 17, Hernandez ignited a bench-clearing brawl by hitting Detroit Tigers shortstop Carlos Guillén in the head to lead off the sixth inning. The two continued to exchange words down the first base line, and Hernandez threw down his glove and went after Guillén. In all, seven players were ejected, most notably Kyle Farnsworth, who tackled Jeremy Affeldt to reignite the situation that had been settling down. Later in his Royals career, Hernandez got into a scuffle with batterymate John Buck.

On August 26, Hernandez pitched his first complete game shutout against the Toronto Blue Jays. The win was made even more special because he defeated Roy Halladay, one of the best pitchers in the game at the time.

Hernandez was released by the Royals on December 7, 2006, and signed to a minor-league contract by the Boston Red Sox on December 22, 2006. The contract he signed with the Red Sox included an opt-out clause that would become effective if he was not on the Major League roster by June 1. On that date, he exercised that option and was released. On June 5, he signed a minor league contract with the New York Yankees. He was released a month later on July 6. On July 17, he signed a minor league contract with the Pittsburgh Pirates, but would be released less than a month later.

On January 17, Hernandez signed a minor league contract with the Houston Astros. In September of that year, Hernandez, 25–36 for career in majors, received a 50-day suspension for testing positive for an amphetamine-based substance. However, the Office of the Commissioner of Major League Baseball announced on Friday, October 17, 2008 that it had withdrawn the suspension of the former Astros' starting pitcher because it was a first offense. The Commissioner’s Office also issued a brief statement to clarify that Hernandez's June 12, 2008 positive test for an amphetamine based substance under the Minor League Drug Prevention Program "shall not constitute a violation," and that Hernandez would not be subject to disciplinary action.

On December 22, Hernandez signed with the Samsung Lions in South Korea's Korea Baseball Organization, but he sought and was issued his release on July 9, 2009.

References

External links

1978 births
Living people
Dominican Republic expatriate baseball players in South Korea
Dominican Republic expatriate baseball players in the United States
Dominican Republic sportspeople in doping cases
Houston Astros players
Indianapolis Indians players
Kansas City Royals players
KBO League pitchers

Major League Baseball pitchers
Major League Baseball players from the Dominican Republic
Omaha Royals players
Pawtucket Red Sox players
Samsung Lions players
Scranton/Wilkes-Barre Yankees players
Sportspeople from Santo Domingo
Round Rock Express players
Wichita Wranglers players